Al Jizah may refer to:
Giza
Al Jizah Governorate
Al Jizah, Jordan